

Champions

Major League Baseball
World Series: New York Yankees over Brooklyn Dodgers (4–3)
All-Star Game, July 8 at Wrigley Field: American League, 2–1

Other champions
All-American Girls Professional Baseball League: Grand Rapids Chicks over Muskegon Lassies
First College World Series: California
First Little League World Series: Maynard, Williamsport, Pennsylvania
Negro League World Series: New York Cubans over Cleveland Buckeyes (4–1)
Negro League Baseball All-Star Game: West, 5–2
Winter Leagues
Cuban League: Alacranes de Almendares
Mexican Pacific League: Presidentes de Hermosillo
Puerto Rican League: Leones de Ponce
Venezuelan League: Sabios de Vargas

Awards and honors
Baseball Hall of Fame
Carl Hubbell
Frankie Frisch
Mickey Cochrane
Lefty Grove
Most Valuable Player
Joe DiMaggio (AL)
Bob Elliott (NL)
Rookie of the Year
Jackie Robinson (ML)
The Sporting News Player of the Year Award
Ted Williams (AL) – OF, Boston Red Sox
The Sporting News Manager of the Year Award
Bucky Harris (AL) – New York Yankees

MLB statistical leaders

Major league baseball final standings

American League final standings

National League final standings

Negro league baseball final standings

Negro American League final standings

Cleveland Buckeyes won the Pennant.

Negro National League final standings

Events

January
January 18 – The Pittsburgh Pirates acquired baseman Hank Greenberg from the Detroit Tigers. The 36-year old veteran Greenberg led the American League in homers with 44 in 1946, as the Pirates will pair him with young slugger Ralph Kiner, who led the National League with 23 home runs in his rookie season. Greenberg will hit 25 homers in his farewell season, while Kiner will lead the major leagues with 51 home runs.
January 21 – A rule change implemented by the Baseball Writers' Association of America that allows voting only for players after 1921 produces four new Hall of Famers: Mickey Cochrane, Frank Frisch, Lefty Grove and Carl Hubbell. Pie Traynor misses selection by only two votes.

February
February 1 – MLB Commissioner Happy Chandler announces the creation of a pension plan for retired major leaguers. Any player with five years of experience will receive $50 a month at age 50 and $10 a month for each o the next five years. The plan extends to coaches, players and trainers active on Opening Day. The plan will be funded by $650,000‚ with the 16 teams providing 80% and the players the remaining 20%.

March
March 1 – New managers in spring training camps are Billy Herman, with the Pittsburgh Pirates; Muddy Ruel, with the St. Louis Browns, Bucky Harris, with the New York Yankees and‚Johnny Neun with the Cincinnati Reds. Neun had ended the 1946 season as manager of the Yankees after both Joe McCarthy and Bill Dickey had quit.

April
April 6 - The New York Yankees sign pitcher Lew Burdette as an amateur free agent.
April 15 – Major League Baseball's color line is officially broken forever when Jackie Robinson makes his Major League debut for the Brooklyn Dodgers against the Boston Braves at Ebbets Field.
April 22 - Ben Chapman, manager of the Philadelphia Phillies, leads his team in racist chants directed at Jackie Robinson of the Brooklyn Dodgers.Happy Chandler, the commissioner of baseball, chastises Chapman for his actions. 
April 27 – It is Babe Ruth Day at Yankee Stadium. Despite having throat cancer, Ruth speaks to the packed house, proclaiming, "The only real game, I think, in the world is baseball."
April 29 - After signing with the New York Yankees the previous winter, Joe Medwick is released despite never playing a single game with the Yankees.

May
May 3 – The St. Louis Cardinals send outfielder Harry Walker to the Philadelphia Phillies in exchange for outfielder Ron Northey. Although batting a paltry .200 with the Cardinals,‚Walker will hit .371 for the Phillies in 130 games to finish the season with a National League-leading .363 batting average.
May 13 :
Ted Williams hits two home over the Green Monster, for the first time in his career at Fenway Park,‚as the Boston Red Sox beat the Chicago White Sox, 19–6. Earlier in the day, Williams had promised a boy in the Malden hospital that he would hit a homer for him. Besides, Bobby Doerr hit for the cycle for the second time in his career, becoming‚the first Sox to do that. Doerr hit a double and one single in the nine-run eighth inning to complete his cycle. Bill Zuber is the winning pitcher over Earl Harrist.
At Crosley Field,‚27,164 fans watch the Cincinnati Reds beat the Brooklyn Dodgers,‚ 7–5. It is estimated that nearly 9,000 of the fans are black‚attracted to the game because of Jackie Robinson. When Robinson came on the field, the Crosley Field organist plays the song  Bye Bye Blackbird.
May 17- It is during a game at Forbes Field that Pittsburgh Pirates first baseman Hank Greenberg asks Dodgers rookie Jackie Robinson if he's okay after a collision between the two earlier in the game. It's then that Greenberg gives Robinson a pep talk telling him to 'stick in there, he'd be fine.' Robinson takes the advice to heart and later writes that Greenberg was his "Diamond Hero." Robinson knows that Greenberg, who as a Jew, withstood his own trial by fire with racial taunts being hurled at him by fans and players.

June
June 18 – Ewell Blackwell pitches a no-hitter, leading the Cincinnati Reds to a 6–0 win over the Boston Braves at Crosley Field. The offense is led by newcomer Babe Young who blasts two three-run homers, while rookie Frankie Baumholtz collects four hits and scores twice, and Grady Hatton adds a single, four walks and two runs scored.
June 22 – Ewell Blackwell just misses pitching back-to-back no-hitters when Eddie Stanky of the Brooklyn Dodgers singles with one out in the 9th inning. Stanky's hit ends Blackwell's hitless-inning skein at 19. Blackwell wins the game, 4–0, for his ninth consecutive victory and improve his record to 11–2.
June 28 – Walker Cooper of the New York Giants hits a home run in his sixth consecutive game to tie a record set by George Kelly in 1924. Cooper had two homers in the first game of the streak, while his shot today helps his brother Morton defeat the Philadelphia Phillies, 14–6, for his first victory on a Giants uniform.
June 29 – At Shibe Park, Ferris Fain lines an inside-the-park grand slam in the fifth inning, as the Philadelphia Athletics top the Boston Red Sox, 6–5.

July
July 5 – Larry Doby makes his debut for the Cleveland Indians, becoming the first black baseball player to join the American League, and fully integrating Major League Baseball.
July 8 – At Wrigley Field, home of the Chicago Cubs, the American League defeats the National League, 2–1, in the All-Star Game.
July 10 – Cleveland Indians pitcher Don Black tosses a no-hitter in a 3–0 win over the Philadelphia Athletics.
July 19 – Hall of Fame Negro leagues player Willard Brown makes his major league debut with the St. Louis Browns. Brown would only appear in 21 games for St. Louis in his only major league season, batting .179 with one home run and six runs batted in.
July 20 – With both Hank Thompson and Willard Brown in the starting line-up, the St. Louis Browns become the first major league club to field two black players at the same time. Both players play all nine innings of both games of a doubleheader with the Boston Red Sox.

August
August 13 – The St. Louis Browns' Willard Brown clubs a pinch hit a two-run, inside-the-park homer against Detroit Tigers pitcher Hal Newhouser, to become the first African American player to hit a home run in American League history.
August 20 – Washington Senators relief pitcher Tom Ferrick loses both games of a doubleheader with the Cleveland Indians. While pitching with the St. Louis Browns the previous season, Ferrick won both games of a doubleheader against the Philadelphia Athletics on August 4.
August 26 – Brooklyn Dodgers' Dan Bankhead became the first black pitcher in the majors. He homered in his first major league plate appearance, but didn't fare well on the mound. In 3 innings of relief, he gave up 10 hits and six earned runs to the Pittsburgh Pirates, who won the game, 16–3.

September
September 1 – Jack Lohrke lead off the eighth inning with a home run off Red Barrett, giving the New York Giants and pitcher Larry Jansen a 2–1 victory over the Boston Braves in the opening game of the Labor Day doubleheader at the Polo Grounds. The 43,106 fans see history as Lohrke's homer is the Giants 183rd homer of the season, surpassing the record of 182 set by the famed 1936 New York Yankees. The Giants win the nightcap, 12–2 and finished the season with 221 homers, but struggle to finish fourth.
September 3 – Bill McCahan of the Philadelphia Athletics no-hits the Washington Senators in a 3–0 victory.
September 15 - At the age of 42, Red Ruffing give up twelve hits over seven innings in a 7-5 loss to the Boston Red Sox in what would be his final major league appearance. The future hall of fame player would be released two weeks later, ending his major league career.

October
October 6 – The New York Yankees defeat the Brooklyn Dodgers, 5–2, in Game 7 of the World Series to win their eleventh World Championship, four games to three. This was the first World Series involving a nonwhite player, as Dodgers 1B Jackie Robinson had racially integrated Major League Baseball at the beginning of the season. It was also the first Series to be shown on television although coverage was limited to New York City and surrounding environs.

November
November 27 – Triple Crown winner Ted Williams (.343 BA, 32 home runs, 114 RBI) is edged out by Joe DiMaggio (.315, 20, 97) for the American League MVP Award by one point. One BBWAA member fails to include Williams anywhere on his ballot.
November 30 – Guillermo Vento became the first Venezuelan Professional Baseball League player to connect six hits in a single game. This record would eventually be matched by Pete Koegel (1974), Steve Carter (1991) and Ramón Flores (2014).

December
December 11 – Brooklyn Dodgers general manager Branch Rickey announces that the club have signed an agreement with Florida entrepreneur Bud Holman and the city of Vero Beach to rent 104 acres of a former pre-war municipal airport. The Dodgers will pay $1 a year and take over the maintenance. In 1952, they will sign a new 20-year lease for $1 a year and, on March 11, 1953, a new field will be named Holman Stadium.

Births

January
January 1 – Jimmie Lee Solomon
January 4 – Ken Reynolds
January 5 – Sandy Vance
January 7 – Scott Reid
January 12 – Leon Everitt
January 12 – Gene Martin
January 12 – Paul Reuschel
January 15 – Gerry Schoen
January 15 – Tony Solaita
January 18 – Sachio Kinugasa
January 21 – Bob Reynolds
January 21 – Bill Stein
January 22 – Senichi Hoshino
January 23 – Kurt Bevacqua
January 27 – John Lowenstein
January 27 – Tim Plodinec
January 30 – Matt Alexander
January 31 – Nolan Ryan

February
February 1 – Jim McKee
February 1 – Danny Thompson
February 3 – Joe Coleman
February 5 – Barry Raziano
February 7 – Ted Ford
February 16 – Terry Crowley
February 20 – Tom Buskey
February 21 – Terry Ley
February 21 – Charley Walters
February 25 – Ken Szotkiewicz

March
March 2 – Jim Nettles
March 4 – Bruce Miller
March 5 – Kent Tekulve
March 7 – Jim Howarth
March 10 – Darcy Fast
March 12 – Bill Butler
March 12 – Greg Garrett
March 14 – Mike Strahler
March 16 – Tom Bradley
March 19 – Garry Jestadt
March 19 – Ángel Mangual
March 19 – Don Rose
March 21 – Bill Plummer
March 23 – Pat Bourque

April
April 4 – Ray Fosse
April 14 – Joe Lahoud
April 17 – Tsutomu Wakamatsu
April 21 – Al Bumbry
April 23 – Pat Jacquez
April 26 – Amos Otis
April 28 – Lute Barnes
April 29 – Tom House
April 29 – Jim Williams
April 30 – Jim Clark

May
May 5 – Larry Hisle
May 10 – John Cumberland
May 10 – Tim Hosley
May 12 – Vic Albury
May 12 – Bob Heise
May 13 – Steve Kealey
May 14 – Dick Tidrow
May 22 – Rich Hinton
May 26 – Darrell Evans

June
June 4 – Doug Griffin
June 7 – Don Money
June 7 – Thurman Munson
June 10 – Ken Singleton
June 16 – Joe Decker
June 25 – José Ortiz

July
July 4 – Jim Minshall
July 4 – Jim Nelson
July 6 – Néstor Chávez
July 6 – Lance Clemons
July 11 – Ron Cook
July 12 – Scipio Spinks
July 14 – Steve Stone
July 14 – Danny Walton
July 15 – Enrique Romo
July 22 – Cliff Johnson
July 22 – George Lauzerique
July 25 – Mick Kelleher
July 25 – Mickey Scott
July 30 – Jim Spencer
July 31 – Pete Koegel
July 31 – Earl Stephenson
July 31 – John Vukovich

August
August 1 – Tony Muser
August 4 – Ken Poulsen
August 5 – Bernie Carbo
August 6 – Jim Dunegan
August 8 – José Cruz
August 9 – Buddy Hunter
August 13 – Jerry Crawford
August 13 – Fred Stanley
August 15 – Billy Conigliaro
August 18 – Bucky Guth
August 18 – Lowell Palmer
August 22 – Bill Burbach
August 27 – Jim York
August 31 – Boots Day

September
September 1 – Craig Skok
September 2 – Mel Behney
September 3 – Bill Gilbreth
September 7 – Dave Wallace
September 11 – Larry Cox
September 12 – John Montague
September 13 – Mike Adamson
September 14 – Harry Parker
September 16 – Gary Ross
September 17 – Candy Harris
September 18 – Bill Champion
September 20 – Pete Hamm
September 21 – Jim Todd
September 24 – Norm Angelini
September 26 – Norm McRae

October
October 1 – Buzz Capra
October 1 – Remigio Hermoso
October 3 – Chuck Scrivener
October 4 – Glenn Adams
October 6 – Jerry Bell
October 6 – Rich Hacker
October 6 – Steve Kline
October 6 – Charlie Vaughan
October 9 – Bob Moose
October 10 – Roger Metzger
October 11 – Rick James
October 11 – Charlie Williams
October 17 – Jim Hutto
October 20 – Rafael Robles
October 26 – Bill Gogolewski

November
November 4 – Loyd Colson
November 6 – Chris Arnold
November 6 – Skip Pitlock
November 7 – Yutaka Fukumoto
November 7 – Don Newhauser
November 8 – Lewis Yocum
November 12 – Ron Bryant
November 13 – Gene Garber
November 17 – Tom Dettore
November 19 – Bob Boone
November 22 – Sandy Alderson
November 22 – John Morlan
November 23 – Dwain Anderson
November 23 – Tom Hall
November 23 – Frank Tepedino
November 26 – Larry Gura
November 26 – Richie Hebner
November 27 – John Harrell

December
December 3 – Wayne Garrett
December 3 – Gerry Pirtle
December 7 – Johnny Bench
December 9 – Jerry Cram
December 10 – Ted Martínez
December 11 – Greg Shanahan
December 13 – Dave Hamilton
December 15 – Ken Crosby
December 17 – Charlie Sands
December 21 – Elliott Maddox
December 26 – Carlton Fisk
December 28 – Aurelio Rodríguez
December 31 – Manny Muñiz

Deaths

January
January 2 – Joe Koukalik, 66, one of four Austrian players in Major League Baseball history, who pitched eight innings in one baseball game for the Brooklyn Superbas in the 1904 season.
January 15 – Jimmy Sheckard, 68, left fielder and leadoff hitter who played for eight different teams in a span of 17 seasons between 1897 and 61913, most notably for the Chicago Cubs from 1906 to 1912, a period in which the Cubs won four National League pennants and two World Series titles in 1907 and 1908.
January 20 – Josh Gibson, 35, Negro leagues All-Star catcher who is considered by baseball historians as one of the best power hitters and catchers in the history of any league, including Major League Baseball, becoming the second Negro league player to be inducted in the National Baseball Hall of Fame behind Satchel Paige.
January 21 – Jimmy Walsh, 60, third baseman who played from 1910 through 1915 for the Philadelphia Phillies, Baltimore Terrapins and St. Louis Terriers.
January 29 – Del Gainer, 60, solid first baseman and line drive hitter who played for the Detroit Tigers, Boston Red Sox and St. Louis Cardinals (1922) during ten seasons between 1909 and 1992. 
January 31 – Johnny Kling, 71, catcher who was key part of the great Chicago Cubs dynasty from the early 1900s.

February
February   5 – Ed Callahan, 89, outfielder and shortstop who played in 1894 for the St. Louis Maroons, Kansas City Cowboys and Boston Reds clubs of the outlaw Federal League. 
February   9 – Dan Barry, 60, American League umpire in 1928 who worked 132 games in his lone AL season; one of only six umpires to eject Lou Gehrig from a game; former sportswriter.
February 10 – Carney Flynn, 72, pitcher who played with the Cincinnati Reds in 1894 and for the New York Giants and Washington Senators in 1896.
February 10 – George Whiteman, 64, outfielder for the 1918 Boston Red Sox World Champions.
February 13 – Sam Shaw, 83, pitcher who played with the Baltimore Orioles of the American Association in 1888 and for the Chicago Colts of the National League in 1893.
February 19 – Hooks Warner, 52, third baseman who played for the Chicago Cubs and the Pittsburgh Pirates in part of four seasons spanning 1916–1921.
February 23 – George Brickley, 52, two-sport athlete who played as an outfielder for the 1913 Philadelphia Athletics, and later played football as a tailback for the Cleveland Tigers and the New York Brickley Giants.
February 24 – Jack Glasscock, 89, flashy fielding shortstop of the 19th century, and the sixth player to collect at least 2,000 hits.
February 27 – Ensign Cottrell, 58, pitcher who played from 1911 to 1915 with the Pittsburgh Pirates, Chicago Cubs, Philadelphia Athletics, Boston Braves and New York Yankees.
February 27 – Jack Calhoun, 67, third baseman the 1902 St. Louis Cardinals.
February 28 – Clarence Stephens, 83, pitcher who played with the Cincinnati Red Stockings in 1886 and for the Cincinnati Reds in 1891.
February 28 – Ike Fisher, 75, catcher and third baseman for the Philadelphia Phillies in its 1898 season, who later managed and owned the Nashville Vols club of the Southern Association.

March
March   2 – Dewey Metivier, 48, pitcher who played for the Cleveland Indians from 1922 to 1924.
March   7 – Dan McGarvey, 57,  left fielder who played for the Detroit Tigers in the 1912 season.
March 20 – Mike Mowrey, 62, outstanding third baseman during the Deadball Era, who played from 1905 through 1915 for five different National League clubs, and was a member of the Brooklyn Robins team that defeated the strong Boston Red Sox in the 1916 World Series.
March 22 – Tony Von Fricken, 77, pitcher for the 1890 Boston Beaneaters.
March 26 – Jim Bluejacket, 59, pitcher who played from 1914 to 1915 with the Brooklyn Tip-Tops and for the Cincinnati Reds in 1916.
March 27 – Pete Lister, 65, first baseman who played in 22 games for the Cleveland Naps during the 1907 season.
March 28 – Johnny Evers, 65, Hall of Fame second baseman who along shortstop Joe Tinker and first baseman Frank Chance formed the most famous double play combination in Major League history, which is memorialized in the legendary poem Baseball's Sad Lexicon, as the trio led the Chicago Cubs during the glory years of 1906–1910 to four National League pennants and two World Series.

April
April   1 – Mike Lynch, 71, center fielder for the 1902 Chicago Orphans of the National League.
April   2 – Charlie Jones, 72, a fine defensive outfielder with a strong arm, who played for the Boston Americans, Chicago White Sox, Washington Senators and St. Louis Browns between 1901 and 1908.
April   4 – Jot Goar, 77, pitcher who played with the Pittsburgh Pirates in 1896 and for the Cincinnati Reds in 1898.
April 12 – Tom Sullivan, 87, pitcher for the Columbus Buckeyes and Kansas City Cowboys in parts of four seasons spanning 1884–1889.
April 20 – Jack Rothfuss, 75, first baseman for the 1897 Pittsburgh Pirates.
April 21 – Steamer Flanagan, 66, outfielder who played for the Pittsburgh Pirates in 1905.
April 25 – John Walsh, 68, third baseman who played for the Philadelphia Phillies in the 1903 season.

May
May   1 – Kitty Bransfield, 72, first baseman who played for the Boston Beaneaters, Pittsburgh Pirates, Philadelphia Phillies and Chicago Cubs in a span of 12 seasons from 1898 to 1911. 
May   1 – Ray Brubaker, 54, veteran minor league player and manager; died in the dugout from a heart attack while managing the Terre Haute Phillies in an Illinois–Indiana–Iowa League game.
May   2 – Ossie France, 88, pitcher for the 1890 Chicago Colts of the National League.
May   5 – Ty LaForest, 30, Canadian third baseman who played for the Boston Red Sox in 1945, one of many ballplayers who only appeared in the major leagues during World War II conflict.
May   6 – Ferdie Moore, 51, first baseman who played for the Philadelphia Athletics during the 1914 season.
May   7 – Michael McDermott, 83, pitcher who played for the Louisville Colonels of the American Association during the 1889 season.
May 18 – Hal Chase, 64, outstanding first baseman whose big league career lasted from 1905 to 1919, who was the most notoriously corrupt player in Major League history and was barred from baseball after a reputed long history of fixing games.
May 19 – Tex Hoffman, 53, third baseman for the 1915 Cleveland Indians.
May 23 – Harry Bemis, 73, catcher who played from 1902 through 1910 for the Cleveland Naps of the American League.
May 23 – Goat Cochran, 56, pitcher who played for the Cincinnati Reds in the 1915 season. 
May 27 – Ed Konetchy, 62, who led National League first basemen in fielding eight times and batted .281 in 2,085 games, as is 2,150 hits included 344 doubles, 181 triples (17th all time), and 74 home runs.
May 27 – Harry Sage, 83, catcher who played in 1890 for the Toledo Maumees of the American Association.
May 31 – Jimmie Wilson, 46, two-time All-Star catcher who played 1,525 games over 18 seasons (1923–1940) with three National League clubs; won World Series rings with the 1931 St. Louis Cardinals and 1940 Cincinnati Reds; managed Philadelphia Phillies (1934–1938) and Chicago Cubs (1941 to April 30, 1944) to a combined 493–735 (.401) record.

June
June 15 – Luke Stuart, second baseman who played in 1921 for the St. Louis Browns, also one of two players to hit an inside-the-park home run in their first Major League Baseball at bat, being the other Johnnie LeMaster, who did it with the San Francisco Giants in 1975.
June 18 – Neal Brady, 50, pitcher who played with the New York Yankees in the 1915 and 1917 seasons and for the Cincinnati Reds in 1925.
June 18 – Jumbo Harting, 82, catcher  who played in 1886 for the St. Louis Browns of the National League.
June 20 – Bob Ewing, 74, pitcher who played from 1902 through 1912 for the Cincinnati Reds, Philadelphia Phillies, and St. Louis Cardinals.
June 30 – Mellie Wolfgang, 57, pitcher for the Chicago White Sox in five seasons from 1914 to 1918.

July
July 4 – Jeff Sweeney, 58, catcher for the New York Highlanders/Yankees in the early 1900s, who in 1914 stole 19 bases, the most ever by a Yankee catcher in a single season.
July 7 – Dick Egan, infielder who played from 1908 through 1916 for the Cincinnati Reds, Brooklyn Robins and Boston Braves.
July 8 – William G. Bramham, 72, president of the Minor Leagues from 1932 to 1946.
July 14 – Orval Overall, 66, pitcher for the 1907/1908 World Champion Chicago Cubs; a right-handed curveball specialist who compiled a lifetime 108–71 record with a 2.23 earned run average, the eighth best ERA in Major League history.
July 16 – Bill Keen, 54, first baseman who played for the Pittsburgh Pirates in the 1911 season.
July 29 – George Bausewine, 78, pitcher for the 1889 Philadelphia Athletics, and later an umpire in the National League. 
July 30 – Chick Robitaille, 68, Franco-American pitcher who had a solid career with the Athletics club of the Quebec Provincial League in the late 1890s, and later posted a 12–8 record with a 2.56 ERA in 26 games for the Pittsburgh Pirates from 1904 to 1905.  
July 30 – Ed Seward, 80, Philadelphia Athletics pitcher who averaged 27 wins from 1887 to 1889, with a career-high 35 in 1888.

August
August   3 – Al Tesch, 56, second baseman who played for the Brooklyn Tip-Tops in the 1915 season.
August   3 – Vic Willis, 71, Hall of Fame pitcher and an eight-time winner of 20 games, a key member of the pennant winning Boston Beaneaters as a rookie in 1898 and also a member of the 1909 world champion Pittsburgh Pirates, who finished with 249 wins, 1651 strikeouts and a 2.63 ERA in only a thirteen-year career.
August   6 – Gene Good, 64, outfielder for the 1906 Boston Beaneaters. 
August 11 – Harry Davis, 74, first baseman and one of the most feared sluggers in the early 1900s, known today primarily for leading in home runs during four consecutive seasons, while guiding the Philadelphia Athletics teams who dominated the newly formed American League, winning six pennants and three World Series between 1902 and 1913, over a career that spanned more than thirty years as a player, coach, manager and scout.
August 14 – Woody Crowson, 28, pitcher for the 1945 Philadelphia Athletics of the American League.
August 15 – Bill Hall, 53, pitcher for the 1913 Brooklyn Superbas of the National League.
August 15 – Carlton Lord, 47, third baseman who played for the Philadelphia Phillies during the 1923 season.
August 21 – King Brady, 66, who pitched with the Philadelphia Phillies, Pittsburgh Pirates, Boston Red Sox and Boston Braves in a span of four seasons between 1905 and 1912.
August 21 – Jacob Fox, 67, pitcher for the Philadelphia Phillies during the 1902 season.
August 26 – Hugh McQuillan, 51, pitcher who played from 1918 to 1927 for the Boston Braves and New York Giants, being also a member of the 1922 World Series champion Giants team.
August 27 – She Donahue, 70, infielder who played in 1904 for the St. Louis Cardinals and Philadelphia Phillies.

September
September   5 – Bill Ludwig, 65, catcher who played in 1908 for the St. Louis Cardinals.
September   6 – Joe Gingras, 53, pitcher who played for the Kansas City Packers of the outlaw Federal League in its 1915 season.
September   8 – Ralph Pond, 59, outfielder who played briefly for the Boston Red Sox during the 1910 season.
September 13 – Ed Lennon, 50, pitcher for the 1928 Philadelphia Phillies.
September 28 – Jim Cockman, 74, Canadian third baseman who played for the New York Highlanders in 1905.
September 28 – Duke Kelleher, 53, catcher for the 1916 New York Giants.
September 29 – Ed Walker, 73, English pitcher who played for the Cleveland Bronchos and Naps clubs from 1902 to 1903.
September 30 – John Halla, 63, pitcher who played in 1905 for the Cleveland Naps.

October
October   1 – Hub Northen, 61, outfielder who played from 1910 through 1912 for the St. Louis Browns, Cincinnati Reds and Brooklyn Dodgers.
October   2 – Charles F. Adams, 70, co-owner, and briefly owner, of the Boston Braves from 1927 to 1935; most known as founder of Boston Bruins of the National Hockey League.
October   2 – Billy Hulen, 77, shortstop who played in 1896 with the Philadelphia Phillies and for the Washington Senators in 1899. 
October   2 – Jim Kane, 65, first baseman for the 1908 Pittsburgh Pirates.
October 10 – Slim Embry, 46, pitcher who played with the Chicago White Sox during the 1923 season.
October 11 – Doc Martel, 64,  catcher and first baseman who played from 1909 to 1910 for the Philadelphia Phillies and Boston Doves.
October 15 – Pol Perritt, 56, pitcher who played 10 seasons from 1912 through 1921 for the St. Louis Cardinals, New York Giants and Detroit Tigers, while helping the Giants win the National League pennant in 1917.
October 23 – Cy Rheam, 54, infield/outfield utility who played for the Pittsburgh Rebels of the Federal League in the 1914 and 1915 seasons.

November
November   2 – Dot Fulghum, 47, infielder for the 1921 Philadelphia Athletics. 
November   7 – Cy Wright, 54, shortstop who played with the Chicago White Sox in the 1916 season.
November 14 – Jack Hoey, 66, outfielder who played from 1906 through 1908 for the Boston Americans and Red Sox clubs. 
November 14 – Stub Smith, 73, shortstop who played for the Boston Beaneaters of the National League in 1898.
November 21 – Slow Joe Doyle, 53, pitcher who played from 1906 to 1910 for the New York Highlanders and Cincinnati Reds.
November 23 – Charlie Newman, 79, outfielder who played for the New York Giants and Chicago Colts in the 1892 season.

December
December   7 – Jud Smith, 78, third baseman who played with the Cincinnati Reds, St. Louis Browns, Pittsburgh Pirates and Washington Senators of the National League in a span of four seasons from 1893 to 1898.
December   9 – Bevo LeBourveau, 51, outfielder who played for the Philadelphia Phillies and the Philadelphia Athletics in all or parts of four seasons spanning 1919–1929.
December 17 – Lee Viau, 81, pitcher who played from 1888 through 1892 for the Cincinnati's Red Stockings and Reds, Cleveland Spiders, Louisville Colonels and Boston Beaneaters.
December 24 – Joe Cobb, 52, catcher who appeared in one game for the Detroit Tigers in the 1918 season.
December 26 – Roxey Roach, 65, shortstop who played from 1910 to 1912 with the New York Highlanders and Washington Senators of the American League, and for the Buffalo Buffeds/Blues of the Federal League in 1915. 
December 26 – Phil Stremmel, 67, pitcher who played for the St. Louis Browns of the American League in the 1909 and 1910 seasons.
December 29 – George Blaeholder, 43, pitcher for the St. Louis Browns, Philadelphia Athletics, and Cleveland Indians in 12 seasons between 1925 and 1936, who is most noted for popularizing the slider pitch.

Sources

External links
Baseball Reference – 1947 MLB Season Summary  
Baseball Reference – MLB Players born in 1947
Baseball Reference – MLB Players died in 1947